The following is a complete list of year-end champions for the Canadian Professional Rodeo Association (CPRA), the sanctioning body for professional rodeo in Canada. In recent times, the CPRA champions have been determined at the Canadian Finals Rodeo in Red Deer, Alberta. Women's all-around champions are determined by the Canadian Girls' Rodeo Association. See here for the inductees of the Canadian Pro Rodeo Hall of Fame.

Contestant Awards
All contestants are from Canada unless otherwise noted.

All-Around Cowboy
 Carl Olson	1945
 Gordon Doan	1946
 Ken Brower	1947
 Reg Kesler	1948
 Bill McLean	1949
 Wilf Girletz	1950
 Reg Kesler	1951
 Bud Van Cleave 1952
 Reg Kesler	1953
 Gordon Earl	1954
 Wilf Girletz	1955
 Dick Nash	1956
 Wilf Girletz	1957
 Brian Butterfield 1958
 Ellie Lewis	1959
 George Myren	1960
 Dick Havens	1961
 Keith Hyland	1962
 George Myren	1963
 Keith Hyland	1964
 Harold Mandeville 1965
 Tom Bews	1966
 Kenny McLean	1967
 Kenny McLean	1968
 Kenny McLean	1969
 Arnold Haraga	1970
 Tom Bews	1971
 Kenny McLean	1972
 Tom Bews	1973
 Phil Doan	1974
 Bob Hartell	1975
 Tom Bews	1976
 Ben Hern	1977
 Mel Coleman	1978
 Tom Bews	1979
 Tom Eirikson	1980
 Tom Eirikson	1981
 Mel Coleman	1982
 Tom Eirikson	1983
 Mel Coleman	1984
 Greg Schlosser 1985
 Tom Eirikson	1986
 Duane Daines	1987
 Mel Coleman	1988
 Mel Coleman	1989
 Steve Dunham	1990
 Duane Daines	1991
 Bernie Smyth	1992
 Steve Dunham	1993
 Rod Warren	1994
 Duane Daines	1995
 Rod Warren	1996
 Rod Warren	1997
 Rod Warren	1998
 Rod Warren	1999
 Rod Warren	2000
 Rod Warren	2001
 Kyle Thomson	2002
 Steven Turner	2003
 Rod Warren	2004
 Jeremy Harden	2005
 Rod Warren	2006
 Steven Turner	2007
 Steven Turner	2008
 Kyle Thomson	2009
 Steven Turner 2010
 Kyle Thomson  2011
 Kyle Thomson  2012
 Travis Reay   2013
 Ky Marshall   2014
 Josh Harden   2015
 Luke Butterfield 2016 
 Ky Marshall   2017
 Jacob Gardner 2018
 Jacob Gardner 2019
 Jared Parsonage 2021
 Wyatt Hayes 2022
Source:

Bareback Riding
 Gordon Doan	1945
 Gordon Doan	1946
 Harold Mandeville 1947
 George Spence	1948
 Bob Duce	1949
 Bob Duce	1950
 Bob Duce	1951
 Bob Duce	1952
 Bob Duce	1953
 Gordon Earl	1954
 Alvin Owen	1955
 Alvin Owen	1956
 Ellie Lewis	1957
 Leo Brown	1958
 Dick Havens	1959
 Leo Brown	1960
 George Myren	1961
 Bob Duce	1962
 Malcolm Jones	1963
 Malcolm Jones	1964
 Jim Clifford	1965
 Malcolm Jones	1966
 Malcolm Jones	1967
 Happy Tegart	1968
 Dale Trottier	1969
 Dale Trottier	1970
 Dale Trottier	1971
 Dale Trottier	1972
 Dale Trottier	1973
 Dale Trottier	1974
 Mel Hyland	1975
 Gene Miller	1976
 Gene Miller	1977
 Dale Trottier	1978
 Steve Dunham	1979
 Jim Dunn	1980
 Steve Dunham	1981
 Steve Dunham	1982
 Robin Burwash	1983
 Robin Burwash	1984
 Jim Dunn	1985
 Jim Dunn	1986
 Robin Burwash	1987
 Steve Dunham	1988
 Robin Burwash	1989
 Steve Dunham	1990
 Billy Laye	1991
 Bill Boyd	1992
 Darrell Cholach 1993
 Bill Boyd 1994
 Davey Shields Jr. 1995
 Darrell Cholach 1996
 Travis Whiteside 1997
 Roger Lacasse	1998
 Darrell Cholach 1999
 Davey Shields	Jr. 2000
 Bill Boyd	2001
 Davey Shields Jr. 2002
 Kyle Bowers	2003
 Roger Lacasse	2004
 Alan Dacyk	2005
 Dusty LaValley	2006
 Dusty LaValley	2007
 Kyle Bowers	2008
 Kyle Bowers	2009
 Dusty LaValley	2010
 Dusty LaValley 2011
 JR Vezain; Cowley, Wyoming, United States 2012
 Matt Lait 2013
 Jake Vold 2014
 Jake Vold 2015
 Jake Vold 2016
 Seth Hardwick; Ranchester, Wyoming, United States 2017
 Richmond Champion; The Woodland, Texas, United States 2018
 Orin Larsen 2019
 Clint Laye 2021
 Ty Taypotat 2022
Source:

Bull Riding
 Frank Voros	1945
 Harry Thomson	1946
 Ralph Thomson	1947
 Wilf Girletz	1948
 Harry Thomson	1949
 Wilf Girletz	1950
 Wilf Girletz	1951
 Wilf Girletz	1952
 Gordon Earl	1953
 Gordon Earl	1954
 Wilf Girletz	1955
 Dick Nash	1956
 Lawrence Hutchison	1957
 Gid Garstad	1958
 Gid Garstad	1959
 Leo Brown	1960
 Leo Brown	1961
 Lawrence Hutchison	1962
 Leo Brown	1963
 Gid Garstad	1964
 Gid Garstad	1965
 Gid Garstad	1966
 Dave Garstad	1967
 Leo Brown	1968
 John Dodds	1969
 Dale Fuhriman	1970
 John Dodds	1971
 John Dodds	1972
 Leo Brown	1973
 Jim Freeman	1974
 Brian Claypool	1975
 Brian Claypool	1976
 John Dodds	1977
 Don Johansen	1978
 Bob Phipps	1979
 Bruce Johansen	1980
 Greg Schlosser	1981
 Brian Aebly	1982
 Dale Johansen	1983
 Dale Johansen	1984
 Greg Schlosser	1985
 Cody Snyder	1986
 Guy Johansen	1987
 Dan Lowry	1988
 Glen Keeley	1989
 Daryl Mills	1990
 Greg Schlosser	1991 
 Daryl Mills	1992
 Wayde Joyal	1993
 Wayde Joyal	1994
 Wes Cyr	1995
 Jay Manning	1996
 Robert Bowers	1997
 Merle Freeman	1998
 Rob Bell	1999
 Rob Bell 2000
 Scott Schiffner	2001
 Justin Volz	2002
 Jody Turner	2003
 Rob Bell	2004
 Chris Hansen	2005
 Tanner Girletz	2006
 Nathan Roy	2007
 Tyler Thomson	2008
 Brett Thompson	2009
 Jesse Torkelson 2010
 Chad Besplug 2011
 Scott Schiffner 2012
 Chad Besplug 2013
 Dakota Buttar 2014
 Dakota Buttar 2015
 Jordan Hansen 2016
 Garrett Smith; Rexburg, Idaho, United States 2017
 Wacey Finkbeiner 2018
 Edgar Durazo; Cuauhtémoc, Sonora, Mexico 2019
 Jared Parsonage 2021
 Jared Parsonage 2022
Source:

Saddle Bronc Riding
 Carl Olson 1945
 Carl Olson 1946
 Joe Keeler 1947
 Carl Olson 1948
 Allan Brown 1949
 Cam Lansdell 1950
 Frank Duce 1951
 Frank Duce 1952
 Ellie Lewis 1953
 Marty Wood 1954
 Marty Wood 1955
 Bob Robinson 1956
 Winston Bruce 1957
 Winston Bruce 1958
 Kenny McLean 1959
 Kenny McLean 1960
 Kenny McLean 1961
 Leo Brown 1962
 Marty Wood 1963
 Rocky Rockabar 1964
 Wayne Vold 1965
 Wayne Vold 1966
 Mel Hyland 1967
 Kenny McLean 1968
 Kenny McLean 1969
 Jerry Sinclair 1970
 Tom Bews 1971
 Mel Hyland 1972
 Jerry Sinclair 1973
 Mel Coleman 1974
 Mel Coleman 1975
 Wilf Hyland 1976
 Mel Coleman 1977
 Mel Coleman 1978
 Mel Hyland 1979
 Wilf Hyland 1980
 Clayton Hines 1981
 Mel Hyland 1982
 Mel Coleman 1983
 Jim Kelts 1984
 Clayton Hines 1985
 Mel Coleman 1986
 Guy Shapka 1987
 John Smith 1988
 Mel Coleman 1989
 Rod Hay 1990
 Duane Daines 1991
 Rod Hay 1992
 Rod Hay 1993
 Rod Hay 1994
 Denny Hay 1995
 Denny Hay 1996
 Rod Hay 1997
 Denny Hay 1998
 Rod Hay 1999
 Glen O'Neill 2000
 Rod Warren 2001
 Rod Hay 2002
 Dustin Flundra 2003
 Rod Hay 2004
 Rod Warren 2005
 Ross Kreutzer 2006
 Dustin Flundra 2007
 Dusty Hausauer 2008
 Chet Johnson; Sheridan, Wyoming, United States 2009 
 Dustin Flundra 2010
 Taos Muncy; Corona, New Mexico, United States 2011
 Luke Butterfield 2012
 Rylan Geiger 2013
 Tyler Corrington; Hastings, Minnesota, United States 2014
 Cody DeMoss; Heflin, Louisiana, United States 2015
 Clay Elliot 2016
 Layton Green 2017
 Clay Elliot 2018
 Zeke Thurston 2019
 Zeke Thurston 2021
 Zeke Thurston 2022
Source:

Steer Wrestling
 Floyd Peters	1945
 Harold Mandeville	1946
 Harold Mandeville	1947
 Carl Olson	1948
 Everett Vold	1949
 Don Dewar	1950
 Tom Duce	1951
 Harold Mandeville	1952
 Brian Butterfield	1953
 Bud Van Cleave	1954
 Brian Butterfield	1955
 Bud Butterfield	1956
 Harold Mandeville	1957
 Bud Butterfield	1958
 Bud Butterfield	1959
 Bud Butterfield	1960
 Brian Butterfield	1961
 Bud Butterfield	1962
 Bud Butterfield	1963
 Alex Laye	1964
 Brian Butterfield	1965
 Harold Mandeville	1966
 Dave Penner	1967
 Dave Penner	1968
 Dave Penner 1969
 Arnold Haraga 1970
 Tom Bews 1971
 Kenny McLean 1972
 Phil Doan 1973
 Lee Phillips 1974
 Ron Ostrom 1975
 Lee Phillips 1976
 Greg Butterfield 1977
 Dave MacDonald 1978
 Greg Butterfield 1979
 Greg Butterfield 1980
 Ken Guenthner 1981
 Blaine Pederson 1982
 Blaine Pederson 1983
 Lee Laskosky 1984
 Greg Cassidy 1985
 Lee Laskosky 1986
 Greg Cassidy 1987
 Greg Cassidy 1988
 Gerald Willsie 1989
 Brad Nielsen 1990
 Mark Roy 1991
 Mark Roy 1992
 Blaine Pederson 1993
 Blaine Pederson 1994
 Todd Boggust 1995
 Lee Graves 1996
 Lee Graves 1997
 Leon Laye 1998
 BJ Zieffle 1999
 Greg Cassidy 2000
 Lee Graves 2001
 David Gibson 2002
 Lee Graves 2003
 Justin Guenthner 2004
 Lee Graves 2005
 Curtis Cassidy 2006
 Todd Woodward 2007
 Cody Cassidy 2008
 Cody Cassidy 2009
 Curtis Cassidy 2010
 Cody Cassidy 2011
 Tanner Milan 2012
 Clayton Moore 2013
 Tanner Milan 2014
 Cody Cassidy 2015
 Cody Cassidy 2016
 Jason Thomas; Benton, Arkansas, United States 2017
 Scott Guenthner 2018
 Scott Guenthner 2019
 Cody Cassidy 2021
 Scott Guenthner 2022
Source:

Tie-Down Roping
 Floyd Peters	1945
 Floyd Peters	1946
 Floyd Peters	1947
 Fred Gladstone	1948
 Cliff Vandergrift	1949
 Fred Gladstone	1950
 Bill Collins	1951
 Bill Collins	1952
 Cliff Vandergrift	1953
 Cliff Vandergrift	1954
 John Hauck	1955
 Bill Collins	1956
 Bill Collins	1957
 Cliff Vandergrift	1958
 Bud Van Cleave	1959
 Harold Mandeville	1960
 Bud Van Cleave	1961
 Lorne Wells	1962
 Lorne Wells	1963
 Lorne Wells	1964
 Bud Van Cleave	1965
 Fred Duke	1966
 Wells	1967
 Lorne Wells	1968
 Jim Gladstone	1969
 Lorne Wells	1970
 Jim Gladstone	1971
 Kenny McLean	1972
 Jim Gladstone	1973
 Lorne Wells	1974
 Gerald Reber	1975
 Bill Reeder	1976
 Lorne Wells	1977
 Harley Hook	1978
 Oscar Walter	1979
 Harley Hook	1980
 Larry Robinson	1981
 Larry Robinson	1982
 Joe Lucas	1983
 Larry Robinson	1984
 Larry Robinson	1985
 Joe Lucas	1986
 Mark Nugent	1987
 Joe Lucas	1988
 Cliff Williamson	1989
 Joe Butterfield	1990
 Cliff Williamson	1991
 Larry Robinson	1992
 Darren Zieffle	1993
 Larry Robinson	1994
 Darren Shaw	1995
 Cliff Williamson	1996
 Joe Lucas	1997
 Marty Becker	1998
 Travis Houff	1999
 Darren Shaw	2000
 Curtis Cassidy	2001
 Cliff Williamson	2002
 Steve Lloyd	2003
 Cliff Williamson	2004
 Jeff Chapman	2005
 Tyson Durfey; Savannah, Missouri, United States 2006
 Clint Robinson; Spanish Fork, Utah, United States	2007
 Tyson Durfey; Savannah, Missouri, United States 2008
 Alwin Bouchard 2009
 Tuf Cooper; Decatur, Texas, United States 2010
 Tyrel Flewelling 2011
 Shane Hanchey; Sulphur, Louisiana, United States 2012
 Timber Moore 2013
 Matt Shiozawa; Chubbuck, Idaho, United States 2014
 Shane Hanchey; Sulphur, Louisiana, United States 2015
 Matt Shiozawa; Chubbuck, Idaho, United States 2016
 Logan Bird 2017
 Shane Hanchey; Sulphur, Louisiana 2018
 Shane Hanchey; Sulphur, Louisiana 2019
 Riley Warren 2021
 Ty Harris; San Angelo, Texas 2022
Source:

Novice Saddle Bronc Riding
 Winston Bruce 1954
 Winston Bruce	1955
 Jack Daines	1956
 Jack Daines	1957
 Garth Maxwell	1958
 Garth Maxwell	1959
 Jim McKenzie	1960
 Wayne Vold	1961
 Floyd Griffin	1962
 Ivan Daines	1963
 Jack Phipps	1964
 Ivan Daines	1965
 Mel Hyland	1966
 Francis Bourque	1967
 Francis Bourque 	1968
 Sanford Cox	1969
 Jack Duce	1970
 Bart Brower	1971
 Brian Claypool	1972
 Jim Kelts	1973
 Keith Gower	1974
 Don McMahon	1975
 Austin Mawson	1976
 Lee Stuckey	1977
 Duane Daines	1978
 Clark Jackson	1979
 Guy Gottfriedsen	1980
 John Smith	1981
 Guy Shapka	1982
 Allan McKenzie	1983
 Mark Leggette	1984
 Norman Kerr	1985
 Vane Hughson	1986
 Denny Hay	1987
 Rod Hay	1988
 Mike Stanton	1989
 Mike Stanton	1990
 Lee Sinclair	1991
 Jay Louis	1992
 Christopher Bews	1993
 Christopher Bews	1994
 Jonathan Blackmore	1995
 Tom Bingham	1996
 Kyle Thomson	1997
 Ben Louis	1998
 Dustin Thompson	1999
 Dustin Flundra	2000
 Sam Kelts	2001
 Riley Harvie	2002
 Jim Berry	2003
 Luke Butterfield	2004
 Scott Lourance	2005
 Cordel Griffith	2006
 Wyatt Daines	2007
 Rylan Geiger	2008
 Rylan Geiger	2009
 Coleman Watt 2010
 Ky Marshall 2011
 Layton Green 2012
 Zeke Thurston 2013
 Lane Cust 2014
 Lane Cust 2015 
 Kolby Wanchuk 2016 
 Dawson Hay 2017
 Cooper Thatcher 2018
 Lachlan Sheppard; Snyder, Texas, United States 2019
 Brodie Roessler 2021
 Colten Powell 2022
Source:

Ladies Barrel Racing
 Ingrid Hewitt 1957
 Viola Thomas 1958
 Viola Thomas 1959
 Isabella Miller 1960
 Viola Thomas 1961
 Gina McDougall 1962
 Gina McDougall 1963
 Jerri Duce 1964
 Jerri Duce 1965
 Jerri Duce 1966
 Geraldine McLaughlin 1967
 Jerri Duce 1968
 Isabella Miller 1969
 Jerri Duce 1970
 Mary McGhie 1971
 Frances Church 1972
 Sandy McNamee 1973
 Jerri Duce 1974
 Jerri Duce 1975
 Jerri Duce 1976
 Jerri Duce 1977
 Elaine Watt 1978
 Elaine Watt 1979
 Mary Lynn Walter 1980
 Sheila Haggart 1981
 Elaine Watt 1982
 Carol Stewart 1983
 Ruth McDougall 1984
 Ruth McDougall 1985
 Gayle Howes 1986
 Ruth McDougall 1987
 Ruth McDougall 1988
 Ruth McDougall 1989
 Rayel Robinson 1990
 Rayel Robinson 1991
 Dee Butterfield 1992
 Nikki Ree 1993
 Dawn Rude 1994
 Debbie Renger 1995
 Debbie Renger 1996
 Dawn Rude 1997
 Debbie Renger 1998
 Rayel Robinson 1999
 Debbie Renger 2000
 Carol Barr 2001
 Carol Barr 2002
 Raylee Edwards 2003
 Jill Bishop 2004
 Rayel Robinson 2005
 Lisa Lockhart 2006
 Debbie Renger 2007
 Lisa Lockhart 2008
 Gaylene Buff 2009
 Rana Koopmans 2010
 Trula Churchill; Valentine, Nebraska, United States 2011
 Lisa Lockhart; Oelrichs, South Dakota, United States 2012
Lisa Lockhart; Oelrichs, South Dakota, United States 2013
 Steffanie Mather 2014
 Nancy Csabay 2015
 Nancy Csabay 2016
 Carman Pozzobon 2017
 Callahan Crossley 2018
 Brooke Wills Kamloops 2019
 Justine Elliott 2021
 Taylor Manning 2022
Source:

High Point
 Leo Brown	1960
 George Myren	1961
 Rocky Rockabar 1962
 Leo Brown	1963
 Rocky Rockabar 1964
 Jim Clifford	1965
 Rocky Rockabar 1966
 Kenny McLean	1967
 Kenny McLean	1968
(Discontinued until 1987)
 Greg Cassidy	1987
 Greg Cassidy	1988
 Gerald Willsie 1989
 Steve Dunham	1990
 Joe Lucas	1991
 Joe Lucas	1992
 Blaine Pederson 1993
 Blaine Pederson 1994
 Darren Shaw	1995
 Rod Warren	1996
 Joe Lucas	1997
 Rod Warren	1998
 BJ Zieffle	1999
 Curtis Cassidy 2000
 Curtis Cassidy 2001
 Robert Bowers	 2002
 Curtis Cassidy 2003
 Rod Warren	 2004
 Lee Graves	 2005
 Curtis Cassidy 2006
 Clint Robinson 2007
 Curtis Cassidy 2008
 Kyle Thomson	 2009
 Curtis Cassidy 2010
 Curtis Cassidy 2011
 Josh Peek      2012
 Morgan Grant   2013
 Curtis Cassidy 2014
 Curtis Cassidy 2015
 Morgan Grant   2016 
 Morgan Grant   2017
 Riley Warren   2018
 Riley Warren   2019
 Riley Warren   2021
Source:

All-Around Cowgirl
 Isabella Miller 1963
 Audrey Henry 1964
 Audrey Henry and Babe Lauder (tie) 1965 
 Isabella Miller 1966
 Isabella Miller 1967
 Isabella Miller 1968
 Isabella Miller 1969
 Donalda Cochrane 1970
 Lorraine McLean 1971
 Lorraine McLean 1972
 Diane White 1973
 Wendy Kazakow 1977 
 Wendy Kazakow 1980
 Wendy Flewelling 1985
 Lawrie Sanders 2016
 Kylie Whiteside 2022

Permit Award
 Blair Wills	1965
 Grant Gurr	1966
 Brian Whitlow	1967
 Lynn Jensen	1968
 Dale Butterwick	1969
 Jerry Sinclair	1970
 Rocky Hubley	1971
 Brian Claypool	1972
 Jim Freeman	1973
 Joe Chomistek	1974
 Larry Robinson	1975
 Don McMahon	1976
 Tom Eirikson	1977
 Rick Shepherd	1978
 Vern Smith	1979
 John Gillis	1980
 Rick Kohorst	1981
 Tom McKenzie	1982
 Mark Laye	1983
 Guy Chomistek	1984
 Clayton Keeley	1985
 John Gibson	1986
 David Reid	1987
 Roland Sippola	1988
 Rod Hay	1989
 Wade Graves	1990
 BJ Zieffle	1991
 Clark Hughson	1992
 Robert Bowers	1993
 Darcy Roy	1994
 Don Blishen	1995
 Brian Thiessen	1996
 Tyler Martens	1997
 Blade Young	1998
 Luke Ellingson	1999
 Chad Davidson	2000
 Denton Edge	2001
 Reid Rowan	2002
 Matt Lait	2003
 Tanner Girletz	2004
 Chad Besplug	2005
 Devon Mezei	2006
 Timber Moore	2007
 Kyle French	2008
 Delano Kjos	2009
 Julie Leggett 2010
 Ty Taypotat 2011
 Ky Marshall 2012
 Kerilee Noval 2013
 Billy West 2014
 Cayla Melby 2015 
 Lane Cust 2016 
 Diane Skocdopole 2017
 Cody Coverchuk 2018
 Edgar Durazo; Cuauhtémoc, Sonora, Mexico 2019
 Lucas Macza 2021
Source:

Rookie of the Year
 Jerry Sinclair 1970
 Rocky Hubley	1971
 Bart Brower	1972
 Lee Phillips	1973
 Mel Coleman	1974
 Ron Ostrom	1975
 Jim Dunn	1976
 Doug Wilkinson	1977
 Robert Hoff	1978
 Darryl Collins	1979
 Cliff Williamson	1980
 Barney Barnson	1981
 Blaine Pederson	1982
 Guy Perozak	1983
 Guy Shapka	1984
 Bob House	1985
 Kevin West	1986
 Mark Nugent	1987
 Roland Sippola	1988
 Denny Hay	1989
 Daryl Mills	1990
 Todd Brantner	1991
 BJ Zieffle	1992
 Darren Shaw	1993
 Jason DelGuercio	1994
 Reg Pomeranz	1995
 Blair Stroh	1996
 Curtis Cassidy	1997
 Craig McPhee	1998
 Luke Ellingson	1999
 Trygve Pugh	2000
 Beau McArthur	2001
 Sam Kelts	2002
 Craig Guthrie	2003
 Dusty Ephrom	2004
 Chad Besplug	2005
 Travis Frank	2006
 Timber Moore	2007
 Dustan McPhee	2008
 Travis Reay	2009
 Ty Pozzobon 2010
 Ty Taypotat 2011
 Chason Floyd 2012 
 Justin Miller 2013
 Billy West 2014
 Lonnie West 2015 
 Lane Cust 2016 
 Diane Skocdopole 2017 
 Cody Lee Coverchuk 2018
 Edgar Durazo; Cuauhtémoc, Sonora, Mexico 2019
 Kash Bonnett 2021

Source:

Steer Riding
 Marty Lyle	1974
 Mark Laye	1975
 Bruce Kostelansky	1976
 Bruce Kostelansky	1977
 Bruce Kostelansky	1978
 Jay Shockey	1979
 Darcy Cressman	1980
 Mark Nugent	1981
 Kelly Crouch	1982
 Glen Keeley	1983
 Shawn Vant	1984
 Jeff Whitlow	1985
 Rod Baptiste Jr.	1986
 Jayson Keeley	1987
 Greg Whitlow	1988
 Davey Shields Jr.	1989
 Denny Golden	1990
 Denny Golden	1991
 Tyler Martens	1992
 Dennis Morton	1993
 Todd Jr. Buffalo	1994
 Jason Finkbeiner	1995
 Kyle Switzer	1996
 Mckenzie Loree	1997
 Tyler Pankewitz	1998
 Tyler Prescott	1999
 Wacey Nash	2000
 Brandon Copithorne	2001
 Brady Scott	2002
 Thomas McNeil	2003
 Tyler Patten	2004
 Tom Clarke	2005
 Kelton Watson	2006
 Dantan Bertsch	2007
 Zeke Thurston	2008
 Shay Marks	2009
 Bryce West 2010
 Brian Symington 2011
 Kagen Schmidt 2012
 Kagen Schmidt 2013
 Coy Robbins 2014
 Luke Ferber 2015
 Dixon Tattrie 2016 
 Luke Ferber 2017
 Tristen Manning 2018
 Tristen Manning 2019
 Kane Scott 2021
 Nash Loewen 2022
Source:

Novice Bareback Riding
 Neal Campbell	1980
 Cam Morris	1981
 Bill Boyd	1982
 Rod Bevans	1983
 Gordon Campbell	1984
 Keith Ullery	1985
 Wade Galloway	1986
 Wade Graves	1987
 Shawn Vant	1988
 Bruce Pierson	1989
 Shane Kesler	1990
 Travis Whiteside	1991
 Jason DelGuercio	1992
 Davey Shields Jr.	1993
 Doug Tkach	1994
 Jay Phipps	1995
 Jay Phipps	1996
 Kyle Bowers	1997
 Kyle Bowers	1998
 Wace Hartell	1999
 Monty Koopman	2000
 Dusty LaValley	2001
 Clayton Bunney	2002
 Clayton Bunney	2003
 Dusty Roberts	2004
 Kevin Taylor	2005
 Luke Creasy	2006
 Jake Vold	2007
 Denver DeRose	2008
 Colin Adams	2009
 Colin Adams 2010
 Coleman Watt 2011
 Jacob Stemo 2012
 Kody Lamb 2013
 Dantan Bertsch 2014
 Wyatt Gleeson 2015
 Tanner Young 2016 
 Connor Hamilton 2017
 Mason Helmeczi 2018
 Chet Dietz 2019 
 Cruz McNulty 2021
 Blake Link 2022
Source:

Rookie of the Year: Ladies Barrel Racing
 Cindy Gamroth	1986
 Lisa Fletcher	1987
 Sylvia Shirley	1988
 Dina Sterr	1989
(not awarded in 1990)
 Leslie Schlosser	1991
 Nikki Ree	1992
 Tracey Schmidt	1993
 Tracy Gulick	1994
 Jackie Scherger	1995
 Traci Creighton	1996
 Hallie Willis	1997
 Jodi Hollingworth	1998
 Sherry Dyck	1999
 Jill Besplug	2000
 Traci Preissl	2001
 Shandel Thomson	2002
 Brooke Ramsay	2003
 Joleen Seitz	2004
 Elaina Black	2005
 Kelly Rycroft	2006
 Janet Moen	2007
 Gaylene Buff	2008
 Adel Hansen	2009
 Diane Skocdopole 2017
 Bertina Olafson 2018
 Stacey Ruzicka 2019 
Source:

Team Roping Headers
 Troy Fischer 2000
 Murray Linthicum 2001
 Daryn Knapp 2002 
 Travis Gallais	2003
 Murray Linthicum	2004
 Travis Gallais	2005
 Justin McCarroll	2006
 Justin McCarroll	2007
 Murray Linthicum	2008
 Travis Gallais 2009
 Chase Simpson 2010 
 Levi Simpson 2011
 Dustin Bird 2012
 Kolton Schmidt 2013
 Levi Simpson 2014
 Roland McFadden 2015
 Dustin Bird 2016 
 Levi Simpson 2017
 Levi Simpson 2018
 Matt Sherwood; Pima, Arizona, United States 2019
 Clay Ullery 2021
 Dawson Graham 2022
Source:

Team Roping Heelers
 Ronald Schmidt 2000
 Rocky Dallyn	2001
 Dwight Wigemyr 2002 
 Travis Gallais	2003
 Rocky Dallyn	2003
 Marty Becker	2004
 Rocky Dallyn	2005
 Brett McCarroll	2006
 Brett McCarroll	2007
 Justin McCarroll	2007
 Dwight Wigemyr	2008
 Kevin Schreiner 2009
 Rocky Dallyn 2010
 Tyrel Flewelling 2011
 Paul Eaves 2012
 Tyrel Flewelling 2013
 Ryon Tittel 2014
 Tyrel Flewelling 2015 
 Russell Cardoza 2016 
 Jeremy Buhler 2017
 Jeremy Buhler 2018
 Hunter Koch; Vernon, Texas, United States 2019
 Tyce McLeod 2021
 Dillon Graham 2022
Source:

Ladies Breakaway Roping
 Kendal Pierson 2021
 Kendal Pierson 2022

Kenny McLean Award
 Jake Gardner 2022

Livestock Awards

Bucking Stock of the Year

Saddle Broncs 
 
Source:

Bareback Broncs 

Source:

Bucking Bulls 

Source:

Canadian Finals Rodeo

Top Stock Awards

Source:

Timed Event Horses of the Year

Tie-Down Roping Horse 

Source:

Steer Wrestling Horse of the Year 

Source:

Barrel Racing Horse with the Most Heart 

Source:

Team Roping Horses of the Year   

Source:

Breakaway Roping Horse of the Year

Discontinued

Horse Racing
 Gus Gottfriedsen	1945
 Elmo Still	1946
 Cliff Vandergrift	1947
 Frank Eppie	1948
 Cliff Vandergrift	1949
 Cliff Vandergrift	1950
 Bud Van Cleave	1951
 Bud Van Cleave	1952
 Cliff Vandergrift	1953
 Orville Strandquist	1954
 Cliff Vandergrift	1955
 Don McLeod	1956
 Orville Strandquist	1957
 Cliff Vandergrift	1958
 Cliff Vandergrift	1959
 Don McLeod	1960
 Cliff Vandergrift	1961
 Pat McHugh	1962
 Pat McHugh	1963
 Jim Clifford	1964
 Greg Kesler	1965
 Greg Kesler	1966
 Greg Kesler	1967
 Pat McHugh	1968
 Ernie Dorin	1969
 Ernie Dorin	1970
 Ernie Dorin	1971
 Ernie Dorin 1972
 Ernie Dorin	1973
 Ernie Dorin	1974
 Don Copithorne	1975
 Ernie Dorin	1976
 Ernie Dorin	1977
 Ernie Dorin	1978
 Ernie Dorin	1979
 Ernie Dorin	1980
 Ernie Dorin	1981
 Glen Helmig	1982
 Ernie Dorin	1983
 Don Copithorne	1984
 Dale Ashbacher	1985
 Dale Ashbacher	1986
 Duane Ashbacher	1987
 Dale Ashbacher	1988
 Dale Ashbacher	1989
 Dale Ashbacher	1990
 Duane Ashbacher	1991
 Dale Ashbacher	1992
 Jesse Doenz	1993
 Jesse Doenz	1994
 Jesse Doenz	1995
 Jesse Doenz	1996
 Jesse Doenz	1997
 Jesse Doenz	1998
 Dale Belisle	1999
 Dale Belisle	2000
 Dale Belisle	2001
 Dan Brown	2002
 Dale Belisle	2003
 Dale Belisle	2004
 Dale Belisle	2005
 Dan Brown	2006
 Dan Brown	2007
 Richard Quarell	2008
 Mark Sawchuk	2009
Source:

Cow Milking
 Padgett Berry	1945
 George Sheline	1946
 Tom Duce	1947
 Fred Gladstone	1948
 Cliff Vandergrift	1949
 Harwood Potter	1950
 John Hauck	1951
 Cliff Vandergrift	1952
 Reg Kesler	1953
 Bill Collins	1954
 George Sutcliff	1955
 Fred Gladstone	1956
 George Sutcliff	1957
 Orville Strandquist	1958
 Alex Laye	1959
 Cliff Vandergrift	1960
 Pat McHugh	1961
 Alex Laye	1962
 Pat McHugh	1963
 Alex Laye	1964
 Wilf Girletz	1965
 Wilf Girletz	1966
 Pat McHugh	1967
 Clark Schlosser	1968
 Pat McHugh	1969
 Allen Currier	1970
 Pat McHugh	1971
 Pat McHugh	1972
 Pat McHugh	1973
 Pat McHugh	1974
 Pat McHugh	1975
 Pat McHugh	1976
 Pat McHugh	1977
 Pat McHugh	1978
 Allen Currier	1979
 Pat McHugh	1980
 Allen Currier	1981
 Allen Currier	1982
 Allen Currier	1983
 Allen Currier	1984
 Keith Smith	1985
 Allen Currier	1986
 Allen Currier	1987
 Bruce Flewelling	1988
 Bruce Flewelling	1989
 Bruce Flewelling	1990
 Duane Ashbacher	1991
 Bruce Flewelling	1992
 Bruce Flewelling	1993
 Bruce Flewelling	1994
 Bruce Flewelling	1995
 Duane Ashbacher	1996
 Todd Munro	1997
 Jim Bowhay	1998
 Doug Boettcher	1999
 Jim Bowhay	2000
 Cary Samulak	2001
 Doug Boettcher	2002
 Jim Bowhay	2003
 Doug Boettcher	2004
 Todd Munro	2005
 Todd Munro	2006
 Todd Munro	2007
 Jim Bowhay	2008
 Carson Bowhay	2009
Source:

Barrel Racing Permit Award
 Carolyn Metcalfe	1990
 Cheryl Robson	1991
 Kirsty Larocque	1992
 Tracey Schmidt	1993
 Jill Parsonage	1994
 Jackie Scherger	1995
 Tracy Matkea	1996
 Hallie Willis	1997
 Maxine Schneidmiller	1998
 Sherry Dyck	1999
 Jill Besplug	2000
 Traci Preissl	2001
 Brooke Ramsay	2002
 Rylee McKenzie	2003
 Lindsey Edge	2004
 Kendra Edey	2005
 Stacie Chisholm	2006
 Gaileen Babcock	2007
 Melanie Beeton	2008
 Haley Keenan	2009
Source:

References

Sources 

Lists of rodeo performers
Rodeo champions
Lists of sports awards